Töreli, historically and still informally known as Babakır, is a village in the Şahinbey District, Gaziantep Province, Turkey. The village is inhabited Turkmens and had a population of 53 in 2022. The inhabitants are Alevis and belong to the Hacım Sultan and Baba Kaygusuz ocaks.

References

Villages in Şahinbey District